Red Creek Wildlife Management Area may refer to:
Red Creek Wildlife Management Area (Mississippi)
Red Creek Wildlife Management Area (Utah)